The Bizyarka is a river in Perm Krai, Russia, a right tributary of Babka which in turn is a tributary of Sylva.

References 

Rivers of Perm Krai